The Museum of the Orient (Portuguese: Museu do Oriente) in Lisbon, Portugal is a museum of Asian art.  The museum opened in May, 2008, and is located in a refurbished industrial building on the Alcântara waterfront. The collection includes Indonesian textiles and shadowplays, Japanese screens, antique snuff bottles, crucifixes made in Asia for Western export, and the Kwok On Collection of masks, costumes, and accessories.

References

External links
Museum website

Museums in Lisbon
Asian art museums in Portugal
Art museums and galleries in Portugal